William Solomons (born 11 February 1933) is an Australian sailor. He competed in the 5.5 Metre event at the 1968 Summer Olympics.

References

External links
 

1933 births
Living people
Australian male sailors (sport)
Olympic sailors of Australia
Sailors at the 1968 Summer Olympics – 5.5 Metre
Place of birth missing (living people)
20th-century Australian people